The carotid canal is a passageway in the temporal bone of the skull through which the internal carotid artery enters the middle cranial fossa from the neck.

Structure 
The carotid canal is located within the middle cranial fossa, at the petrous part of the temporal bone. Anteriorly, it is limited by posterior margin of the greater wing of sphenoid bone. Posteromedially, it is limited by basilar part of occipital bone. It is divided in three parts, namely, ascending petrous, transverse petrous, and ascending cavernous parts. The carotid canal has two openings, namely internal and external openings. The internal opening is situated laterally to foramen lacerum. The external opening of the carotid canal is located posterolaterally to the foramen lacerum. Both internal and external openings of the carotid canal lies anterior to the jugular foramen, where the latter is located inside the posterior cranial fossa. The carotid canal is separated from middle ear and inner ear by a thin plate of bone.

Function 
The canal transmits internal carotid artery, together with its sympathetic nerve plexus, and venous plexus.

Clinical significance 
Any skull fractures that damage the carotid canal can put the internal carotid artery at risk. Angiography can be used to ensure that there is no damage, and to aid in treatment if there is.

Other animals
The carotid canal starts on the inferior surface of the temporal bone of the skull at the external opening of the carotid canal (also referred to as the carotid foramen). The canal ascends at first superiorly, and then, making a bend, runs anteromedially. Its internal opening is near the foramen lacerum, above which the internal carotid artery passes on its way anteriorly to the cavernous sinus.

The carotid canal allows the internal carotid artery to pass into the cranium, as well as the carotid plexus traveling on the artery.

The carotid plexus contains sympathetics to the head from the superior cervical ganglion. They have several motor functions: raise the eyelid (superior tarsal muscle), dilate pupil (pupillary dilator muscle), innervate sweat glands of face and scalp and constricts blood vessels in the head.

Additional images

References

External links 
 
 
 Photo at Winona.edu

Foramina of the skull